His Honour Hugh Emlyn-Jones JP (1902 – 9 June 1970), was a British Judge and briefly a Liberal Party politician.

Background
Emlyn Jones was the son of Evan and Ellen Jones of Newton-le-Willows, St Helens. He was educated at Manchester Grammar School and Manchester University where he won a First Class Honors in Law, after winning a Dauntesey University Legal Scholarship. He won the Vice-Chancellor of Lancaster’s Prize and John Peacock Prize. He married, in 1938, Morfudd Davies of Cardiff. They had one son.

Politics
At the age of 27 Emlyn Jones was Liberal candidate for the Chorley Division of Lancashire at the 1929 General Election;

He did not stand for parliament again.

Professional career
Emlyn-Jones started practicing law as a solicitor in Manchester. For 5 years he gave his services voluntarily as a Poor Man's Lawyer. He was Called to the bar, Middle Temple in 1930 and practised on the Wales and Chester Circuit and in London. He was  Standing Counsel for the Post Office on Circuit. He served in the RAF in the War of 1939–45, firstly as an Intelligence Officer with 604 Squadron and later on the Air Staff as an acting Wing Commander. He was made an Honorary Squadron Leader in the RAF. After the war he became a Judge of the County Courts, on Circuit No. 7 (Birkenhead, Chester, etc.) from 1950–65. He also served as a Justice of the peace.

External links 
Hugh Emlyn-Jones at the National Portrait Gallery: http://www.npg.org.uk/collections/search/person/mp77045/hugh-emlyn-jones

References

1902 births
1970 deaths
Liberal Party (UK) parliamentary candidates
Alumni of the University of Manchester
County Court judges (England and Wales)
Members of the Middle Temple
Royal Air Force officers
Royal Air Force personnel of World War II
English justices of the peace
People educated at Manchester Grammar School
Lawyers from Manchester
20th-century English judges